was an admiral in the early Imperial Japanese Navy.

Biography
Fujii was born as the eldest son of a samurai of the Okayama Domain in the present day city of Okayama. He attended the 7th class of the Imperial Japanese Naval Academy, graduating 7th out of 30 cadets. One of his classmates was the future Prime Minister Kato Tomosaburo. He was commissioned as a sub-lieutenant in November 1883, and promoted to lieutenant in December 1886. From April to July 1894, he was a military attaché to Italy.

At the start of the First Sino-Japanese War, Fujii was serving with the Imperial Japanese Navy General Staff; however, he was assigned to combat duty on the captured Chinese gunboat Soko, the gunboat  and the corvette  on which he was promoted to lieutenant commander and appointed executive officer from February 1895. 
After the war, Fujii was sent to the United Kingdom to supervise the construction of the cruiser , and was promoted to commander on 1 December 1897. However, from May to December 1900, he served on the staff of the Governor-General of Taiwan, followed by a brief period in early 1902 as military attaché to Berlin. He returned to the Navy General Staff from February 1901 to October 1903.

On 15 October 1903, Fujii returned to sea as captain of the cruiser . He participated in combat missions during the first year of the Russo-Japanese War, including the pursuit of the Russian Vladivostok Cruiser Squadron during the Hitachi Maru Incident and the Battle off Ulsan. He became chief of staff of the IJN 2nd Fleet in January 1905 and was promoted to rear admiral on 2 November 1905.

After the war, Fujii served briefly as chief of staff of the Yokosuka Naval District and the IJN 1st Fleet and director of the Sasebo Naval Arsenal. He was promoted to vice admiral on 1 December 1909 and became Vice-Chief of the Imperial Japanese Navy General Staff. In 1913, he was Commander-in-Chief of the Sasebo Naval District, and in 1915, was commander in chief of the IJN 1st Fleet and the Yokosuka Naval District. He was promoted to full admiral on 1 December 1916, becoming a naval councilor. He went into the reserves in 1920.

References

External links

Notes 

1858 births
1926 deaths
Imperial Japanese Navy admirals
Japanese military personnel of the First Sino-Japanese War
Japanese military personnel of the Russo-Japanese War
People of Meiji-period Japan
People from Okayama